A traffic stop, commonly referred to as being pulled over, is a temporary detention of a driver of a vehicle and its occupants by police to investigate a possible crime or minor violation of law.

United States

A traffic stop is usually considered to be a Terry stop and, as such, is a seizure by police; the standard set by the United States Supreme Court in Terry v. Ohio regarding temporary detentions requires only reasonable articulable suspicion that a crime has occurred or is about to occur. Traffic stops can be initiated at any time during the detention and arrest process, ranging from stops prior to arrest or issuance of a ticket for violation based on probable cause.

Before probable cause 
Traffic stops may be executed upon reasonable articulable suspicion that a crime has occurred, which can range from an observation of a possible equipment violation to suspicion of driving under the influence (DUI) based on driving behavior.  In some jurisdictions, general roadblock checkpoints are applied for random checks of driver.  A primary purpose of the traffic stop at this point is frequently to determine if the police have probable cause for arrest.  At this stage, the police are not required to issue a Miranda warning, because a traffic stop prior to formal arrest is not considered to be custodial under Miranda, and will often ask questions intended to elicit the suspect to provide answers that may be used as evidence in the event of an arrest.

Non-evidentiary testing falls under this stage because implied consent laws in the US generally do not apply to Preliminary Breath Test (PBT) testing (small handheld devices, as opposed to evidential breath test devices).  (For some violations, such as refusals by commercial drivers or by drivers under 21 years of age, some US jurisdictions may impose implied consent consequences for a PBT refusal, but these are generally not considered to be a refusals under the general "implied consent" laws.) Participation in "field sobriety tests" (FSTs or SFSTs) is voluntary in the U.S..

Probable cause 

Probable cause is the arrest stage in which sufficient evidence is available to sustain a warrant for arrest.  Probable cause is a stronger standard of evidence than a reasonable suspicion, but weaker than what is required to secure a criminal conviction.  In some cases, notably DUI stops, the "sufficient evidence" is used for requiring an evidentiary chemical test (e.g., evidential breathalyzer test) by invoking an implied consent request.  While state terminology regarding whether evidentiary testing is an "arrest", such testing is constitutionally a "search incident to arrest".

Procedure

A stop is usually accomplished through a process known as "pulling over" the suspect's vehicle. Police vehicles (except those used by undercover personnel) traditionally have sirens, loudspeakers, and lightbars that rotate or flash.  These devices are used by the officer to get the attention of the suspect and to signal that they are expected to move over to the shoulder and stop. Failure to comply could result in citation of failure to yield to an emergency vehicle and possibly raise suspicion that the driver is attempting to flee.

Similar alerting devices are also typically equipped on other emergency vehicles such as fire trucks and ambulances, although police departments often use blue lights to signal drivers to pull over. In all cases, such signals and the laws requiring that other vehicles pull to the shoulder allow the emergency vehicles to pass other traffic safely and efficiently when responding to emergency situations. In the case of a traffic stop, the officer pulls the patrol vehicle behind the subject vehicle as it stops instead of proceeding past as he or she would during other emergency responses.

Depending upon the severity of the offense which the officer believes to have occurred, the officer may either arrest the suspect, by taking him or her to jail, or check for any outstanding warrants before issuing a citation also called a notice to appear or summons in some jurisdictions, which is essentially a traffic ticket. In some cases, officers may choose to simply issue a verbal or written warning.

Many states have enacted laws requiring freeway traffic approaching the police vehicle to merge over to the left, leaving an entire lane as a buffer zone for the officer.

A "felony" or "high-risk" traffic stop occurs when police stop a vehicle which they have strong reason to believe contains a driver or passenger suspected of having committed a serious crime, especially of a nature that would lead the police to believe the suspects may be armed (such as an armed robbery, assault with a weapon, or an outstanding felony warrant for the registered owner). In a high risk stop, officers attempt to provide their own safety by issuing instructions to maintain absolute control over every step of the proceedings.

They will have additional officers on scene for back-up, often waiting for additional officers to join up before initiating the stop. They will typically have their weapons drawn, and stay back from the suspect's vehicle, using their patrol cars for cover. If there is no choice but to make the stop on a busy street, then they will often stop traffic. They will address the driver and any passengers over the PA speaker of the patrol car, typically instructing the driver to turn the engine off, remove the keys from the ignition, and sometimes toss them out the window. They will instruct the occupants, one at a time, to exit the vehicle with empty hands showing, place their hands on top of or behind their heads, walk backwards some distance, and then lie flat on the ground, where they will remain until all occupants have done likewise, at which point officers will move up, apply handcuffs, do a body search and then secure the suspects in the patrol cars. The vehicle is then typically searched for weapons and other evidence in accordance with the arresting department's standard operating procedures ("S.O.P.'s").

The Supreme Court has held that an officer who stops a vehicle as part of a routine traffic stop has the authority to order the driver to exit the vehicle, as well as to order any passengers to exit the vehicle.

Federal government 

The United States federal government has long used local traffic enforcement as a tool to further its goals through providing funding and training. Historically, this goal has been drug interdiction, but this has been expanded to include the War on Terror. Currently, the National Highway Traffic Safety Administration (NHTSA) in cooperation with two agencies in the United States Department of Justice (the Bureau of Justice Assistance and the National Institute of Justice) actively promote a program called Data-Driven Approaches to Crime and Traffic Safety (DDACTS) which provides training to local police forces to combine traffic enforcement with fighting crime. In the past, such approaches have been accused of promoting racial profiling.

Controversy

Reducing minor traffic stops

Several states and cities have restricted or discouraged minor traffic stops, such as for broken equipment, to avoid dangerous interactions between drivers and armed law enforcement,
which put both police and drivers at risk
and lower trust in the police.
Nationally, 43% of traffic stops are for speeding, 24% for broken equipment, and 9% for suspected criminal activity.
7% of killings by police started with a traffic stop. Two thirds of killings by police started with no crime or a nonviolent crime.

Jurisdictions can still use traffic cameras,
send tickets in the mail
and can pull the car over and send a text message if both driver & police agency sign up for the service.

75% of police have not received recent hands-on training in removing a noncompliant person from a vehicle. Noncompliance was most common in cases of alcohol, drugs or illegal activity, and 42% of noncompliance involved disobeying the officer, while 24% involved not answering the officer' questions, a practice recommended by lawyers.
Some North Carolina cities encouraged drivers to refuse searches by requiring the officer to get a signed form, which clarified the voluntary nature of searches.

Some departments have quotas for at least a minimum number of traffic stops per officer per month,
or supervisor pressure.

Stanford has compiled data on racial disparities in 200 million traffic stops.
Stops are particularly common and harmful for minorities.
Illinois in 2016 found contraband in one stop per 242.
In July 2021 a study found that State patrol traffic stops were not associated with reduced motor vehicle crash deaths and suggested other strategies such as motor vehicle modifications, community-based safety initiatives, improved access to health care, or prioritizing trauma care as other reduction efforts. 
France, England and Wales use traffic stops at a quarter to a third of the US rate.

Table of state & local practices

Legal basis for stops
In the United States, traffic stops have been criticized for their use in police dragnets to check compliance with laws such as those requiring the use of seat belts or those prohibiting driving while impaired. Some people have objected that the tactic violates the United States Constitution; the Fourth Amendment to the Constitution, part of the Bill of Rights, contains a provision against unreasonable search and seizure. However, the United States Supreme Court has ruled that a motor vehicle is subject to a diminished expectation of privacy as compared to a home.  Reasons include the fact that motor vehicles are typically driven on public streets, that said vehicles are generally subject to public licensing and registration requirements, and that said vehicles are generally held out to public view in a way different than that of traditional dwellings.

In Delaware v. Prouse, 440 U.S. 648 (1979), the U.S. Supreme Court ruled that the police stopping vehicles for no reason other than to check the drivers' licenses and registrations was unconstitutional.
In New York v. Belton, 453 U.S. 454 (1981), the U.S. Supreme Court ruled that when a police officer has made a lawful arrest of a driver, he may search the passenger area of the vehicle without obtaining a warrant. Recent Court decisions have limited the scope of the search even further.
In Michigan Dept. of State Police v. Sitz, 496 U.S. 444 (1990), the U.S. Supreme Court ruled that the use of sobriety checkpoints is constitutional. Under the Ninth Amendment to the U.S. Constitution, states have the right to reasonably regulate the safety, health, and welfare of their citizens.
In Illinois v. Caballes, 543 U.S. 405 (2005), the U.S. Supreme Court held that a dog sniff, conducted during a concededly lawful traffic stop that reveals no information other than the location of a substance that no individual has any right to possess, does not violate the Fourth Amendment.
In Arizona v. Gant, (2008), the U.S. Supreme Court ruled that an officer must demonstrate a threat to their safety or a need to preserve evidence related to the crime of arrest in order to search a vehicle pursuant to an arrest, distinguishing New York v. Belton.
In Rodriguez v. United States (2015), a case originating in federal court, the Supreme Court declared that the protraction of a traffic stop with the intent to use a sniffer dog to search for evidence for which no reasonable suspicion exists is violative of the Fourth Amendment.

See also
 Traffic ticket
 Traffic police
 Highway patrol
 State police
 Traffic warden
 Consent search
 Car chase
 Motor vehicle exception

References

Further reading

External links

 
 Narcotics searches in traffic stops OK – Jerry Seper, The Washington Times (January 25, 2005)
 Police Behavior during Traffic and Street Stops Bureau of Justice Statistics
 Traffic Stop Data Reports Texas Department of Public Safety

Law enforcement
Law enforcement in the United States
Law enforcement techniques
Searches and seizures
Traffic law